Margaret Ethelwyn Hone (2 October 1892 –  14 October 1969) was an influential mid–20th century astrologer and astrological author. She was also known as "Peg Hone".

She was born at Studley, Warwickshire, England.

Margaret Hone's best known book was "The Modern Text Book of Astrology" which was adopted as the official textbook for the FAS (Faculty of Astrological Studies) of the United Kingdom for many years. Charles Carter, who wrote the preface to the book, clearly felt that Hone's work was a step forward in the teaching of astrology.

She co-founded (with Charles Carter and others) the "Faculty of Astrological Studies". Carter became the first principal, Margaret Hone the second. She also helped to found the UK Astrological Association in 1958.

Books
Hone, Margaret: "Applied Astrology"
Hone, Margaret: "The Modern Text Book of Astrology"

1892 births
1969 deaths
English astrological writers
English astrologers
People from Stratford-on-Avon District